The 2022–23 English women's football winter transfer window runs from 1 January 2023 to 2 February 2023. Players without a club may be signed at any time, clubs may sign players on loan dependent on their league's regulations, and clubs may sign a goalkeeper on an emergency loan if they have no registered senior goalkeeper available. This list includes transfers featuring at least one club from either the Women's Super League or the Women's Championship that were completed after the end of the summer 2022 transfer window on 31 August and before the end of the 2022—23 winter window.

Transfers
All players and clubs without a flag are English.

References 
 Women’s transfer window January 2023 – all deals from Europe’s top five leagues, The Guardian

2022–23 in English football
England women
Winter 2022-23 women